"Freak Like Me" is a song by American R&B singer Adina Howard, released on January 25, 1995, as the debut single from her first album, Do You Wanna Ride? (1995). The song reached number two on the US Billboard Hot 100 for two weeks, as well as number two on the Billboard Hot R&B Singles chart for four weeks, and was certified platinum by the Recording Industry Association of America (RIAA) for sales of one million copies. The song has been covered by several artists, including British girl group Sugababes, who reached number one on the UK Singles Chart with their version in 2002.

Background
"Freak like Me" is a R&B song with a g-funk beat. The song's drum beat is sampled from Sly & the Family Stone's "Sing a Simple Song". The song also interpolates "I'd Rather Be with You" by Bootsy's Rubber Band. Hence, Eugene Hanes, Marc Valentine, Loren Hill, William "Bootsy" Collins, and George Clinton's son George Jr. (the last of whom died in 2010) are credited as joint authors and composers. In honor of the song's 20th anniversary, a documentary focusing on the song's (and singer Adina Howard's) impact was released titled Adina Howard 20: A Story of Sexual Liberation. It received a nomination for "Outstanding Independent Documentary" at the 2016 Black Reel Awards.

Critical reception
Bill Speed from the Gavin Report stated that newcomer Howard "is hot with her debut single "A Freak like Me", but don't be fooled by what appears to be another coochie song. It's way more than that." He concluded with that it "will be one of those funky hip-hop flavored hits that all demos will enjoy." Chuck Campbell from Knoxville News Sentinel complimented its "memorable chorus". Alan Jones from Music Week felt "it's a record with immense pedigree; a softly percolating laidback soul/R&B nugget which reveals its subtle strength. With repeated plays it should dent the Top 40 this time and open up the market for Ms Howard's excellent album Do You Wanna Ride?" Ralph Tee from the RM Dance Update wrote, "The track is pure hip hop soul combining Snoop Dogg and Dr. Dre beats and sounds with a style of vocal that's taken Brandy all the way with "I Wanna Be Down"." Another editor, James Hamilton, described it as a "slinkily rolling r&b swayer."

Music video
The original music video for the song was directed by American director Hype Williams.

Track listing
 "Freak like Me" (radio version) – 4:04
 "Freak like Me" (remix featuring rap by Inspector Rick) – 4:17
 "Freak like Me" (dub instrumental) – 4:12
 "Freak like Me" (remix without rap) – 4:06
 "Freak like Me" (instrumental) – 4:10
 "Freak like Me" (a cappella) – 2:35

Charts

Weekly charts

Year-end charts

Certifications

|}

Tru Faith & Dub Conspiracy version

On 28 August 2000, a collaboration between two UK garage groups, Tru Faith & Dub Conspiracy, released a cover version of "Freak like Me". English singer Imaani provided vocals on the song. This version reached number 12 on the UK Singles Chart and number one on the UK Dance Singles Chart. The CD and 12-inch formats include remixes by Wideboys and Dome.

Track listings
 UK CD maxi-single
 "Freak like Me" (radio edit) – 3:21
 "Freak like Me" (original mix) – 4:49
 "Freak like Me" (Wideboys Vocal Mix) – 5:01
 "Freak like Me" (Dome's Freaky Deaky Mix) – 5:59

 UK 12-inch vinyl
A1. "Freak like Me" (original mix) – 4:49
A2. "Freak like Me" (Wideboys Dub) – 4:35
B1. "Freak like Me" (Vocal Remix) – 5:10
B2. "Freak like Me" (Freaky Deaky Mix) – 5:10

Charts

Sugababes version

In 2002, English girl group Sugababes recorded a cover of "Freak like Me". Conceived and produced by English producer Richard X, the cover samples the 1979 song "Are "Friends" Electric?" by Gary Numan and Tubeway Army. In 2001, Richard X had created a bootleg mashup of the original recordings of "Freak Like Me" and "Are "Friends" Electric?", titled "We Don't Give a Damn About Our Friends", which he released under the alias Girls on Top. That song became a successful underground dance track. Richard X wanted to release the mashup commercially, but he could not get permission from Howard to use her vocals, so he enlisted the Sugababes to re-record the vocals.

"Freak like Me" was released on April 22, 2002, as the lead single from their second studio album, Angels with Dirty Faces (2002). It was the first Sugababes single to feature Heidi Range, who joined after the departure of Siobhán Donaghy in August 2001. The Sugababes version blends the original recording's samples into an R&B and rock track. This version of the song used the radio edit lyrics of Howard's song ("brotha" is used instead of "nigga"). Numan was now credited as a co-writer of the song. A remix of the song, billed as the "We Don't Give a Damn Mix", was used for the video and also appears on Richard X's 2003 album Richard X Presents His X-Factor Vol. 1.

Critical reception
The Guardian named "Freak like Me" as the best number-one single of 2002. NME complimented the track as "genius" and claimed, "if this gets to number one, we'll be grinning all summer. Yes, even the Critics." Billboard named the song number 45 on their list of 100 Greatest Girl Group Songs of All Time. 

Numan considered the Sugababes version of "Freak like Me" to be better than "Are 'Friends' Electric?".

Chart performance
"Freak like Me" was released in the United Kingdom on April 22, 2002. The song became Sugababes' first number-one single when it debuted at number one on the UK Singles Chart, remaining in the top 10 for four weeks. The British Phonographic Industry certified the song gold for selling and streaming over 400,000 units.

Outside of the United Kingdom, the song was also successful: it reached the top 10 in Flanders, Ireland, and Norway. In Australia, "Freak like Me" was released on June 17, 2002, and became the fourth single by Sugababes to make the singles chart, reaching number 44. It would be their lowest-charting single in Australia until the release of "Shape" in 2003.

Music video
The music video was directed by Dawn Shadforth and Sophie Muller and was filmed in London. It uses the "We Don't Give a Damn Mix" of the song, which is more faithful to the original mash-up. Set in a strange nightclub, the video serves to introduce then-recently added member Heidi Range. It begins outside the nightclub with a man tumbling down the stairs, with Keisha Buchanan in a long coat, seen only from below the knee, walking out of a door, over the man's body and up the stairs. Mutya Buena is seen standing on the stairs facing the direction where the man is lying. Inside, they spot Range dancing and flirting with many guys. They both quickly clash with her, and a fight between them ensues, which ends with Range falling to the floor unconscious. A man tries to help her up, but Buena grabs him by the neck and throws him away from her. Range wakes up again soon after, and stumbles out of the club with another man, where they begin to kiss, until she suddenly bites hard into his arm. Meanwhile, Buchanan takes a man outside, and she leads him into a dark alley, where they flirt briefly, before she scares him away. Buena then goes outside as well, and overpowers a man who towers over her. The music video ends with Buchanan and Buena accepting Range into the group, and dancing into the night. The demonstrations of supernatural strength shown throughout the video and Range biting the man on the arm are generally understood to imply that the women are, as the song suggests, vampire-like "freaks." Julian Morris stars in the music video as one of the boys running from Buena.

Track listings

Notes
  denotes additional producer(s)

Charts and certifications

Weekly charts

Year-end charts

Certifications

Release history

References

1994 songs
1995 debut singles
2000 singles
2002 singles
Adina Howard songs
East West Records singles
Island Records singles
Mashup songs
Music videos directed by Hype Williams
Number-one singles in Scotland
Positiva Records singles
Song recordings produced by Richard X
Songs written by George Clinton (funk musician)
Sugababes songs
UK Singles Chart number-one singles
Universal Records singles